Tamale Senior High School formerly Government Secondary School, Tamale, Gbewaa Secondary School, and more recently Tamale Secondary School is a co-educational second cycle boarding school located at Education Ridge, a suburb of the Sagnarigu Municipality (which was carved out of the Tamale Metropolis in 2012) in the Northern Region of Ghana. The school was founded in 1951 by the then British Colonial Authorities as the first second cycle institution of the Northern Territories.

The school is a selective school that grants admissions to students in Ghana based on their results in the Basic Education Certificate Examination, and for students outside Ghana, based on a special entrance examination prepared by the school. Courses offered by the school include; Business, General Science, Home Economics, Technical, General Arts, and Visual Arts.

Tamale Senior High School is considered amongst institutions of the highest prestige in Ghana, due to its longstanding history predating independent Ghana, and its prominent alumni. The school can count amongst its ranks; a head of State,  two vice presidents of the fourth republic of Ghana, a speaker of parliament, two Justices of the Supreme Court of Ghana, two Chiefs of Defence Staff, and a host of government ministers and members of parliament.

History 
Tamale Senior High School was founded by then British Colonial Administration as Government Secondary School, Tamale in 1951. The school then became the first secondary school in then Northern Territories under the then British Colonial Administration. The main objective of the establishment of the institution amongst others was to mitigate the widening gap of the human resource capacity between the North and the South of the then British  Colony. The school throughout its existence has gone various name changes. In 1972, the name of the school was changed to Gbewaa Secondary School. The name was later changed to Tamale Secondary School and now, Tamale Senior High School.

Admissions 
As a selective school, admissions are based on the results of applicants in the Basic Education Certificate Examination (BECE). After the results are released, students gain admission through a computerised system that selects students who chose the school prior to writing their BECE based on their raw score. Due to this, students gain admission solely on merit. For students outside Ghana who want to attend the school, special entrance examinations are organised by the school to accept such students based on merit. After students who qualify are given admission, they are given an official prospectus which will help them know what is required of them as new students of the school.

Curriculum and halls of residence 
Courses provided by the school at its inception were; English, Mathematics, Science, History, Latin, Geography, Citizenship, Hygiene and Physiology, Agriculture, Music, Arts and Crafts. The Crafts taught were Cloth Weaving, Book Binding, Leather Work and Pottery. Today, courses run by the school include; Business, General Science, Home Economics, Technical, General Arts, and Visual Arts. Students who apply for the school also choose the course they will want to offer prior to writing their BECE examination. The computerised system subsequently places students not only into the school but also into their preferred course.

There are eight halls of residence in the school and they are;

 Tamakloe House
 Gbewaa House
 Pattinson House
 Nkrumah House
 Hayfron House
 Wemah House
 Gbadamosi House
Bawumia House

Former Headmasters 

1.1960–1964   Mr. Kenneth L. Purser

2. 1964–1967   Mr. B. O. Ayittey

3. 1967–1969   Mr. A. F. Clayton

4. Sept. 1969–1970   Mr. W. A. Ofori

5.1970–1973   Mr. Adu

6. 1973–1981  Alhaji Rahimu Gbadamosi

7. 1981–1982  Mr. S. M. Amankwa

8. 1983–1986  Mr. Mahama Adam (AG)

9. 1986–1988   Mr. L. M. Awuni (AG)

10. 1988–1990   Mr. E. K. Kudiabor

11. 1990–1991   Mr. A. A. Daramanu

12. 1991–1998   Mr. Bolina Saaka

13. 1998–2001   Alhaji Amadu Belko

14. Feb. 2001 – Oct. 2001   Mrs. Mary Asobayire Dan-Braimah (AG)

15. Oct. 2001–2004.. Alhaji Mahamadu Saani Abdul-Rahman

16. 2005–2008   Alhaji T. A. Mahama

17. 2004–2005   Mr. J. B. Dakorah

18. 2008–2016   Mr. J. B. Dakorah

19. 2008–2016   Mrs. Mary Asobayire Dan-Braimah

20.2016–ŋun na beni   Hajia Amina Musah

21. 2017 Shaibu Adams Wilberforce

22. 2021 Rev Edward Azika

Alumni 

Alumni of Tamale Senior High School are those old students who have excelled in their various fields of endeavor. Alumni of the school have played prominent roles in government and public service. Some these old students are listed below;

Government and politics 

 Hilla Limann, President of Ghana (1979-1981)
 Aliu Mahama, vice-president of Ghana (2001-2008)
 Mahamudu Bawumia, vice-president of Ghana (2016-)
 Alban Bagbin, Minister for Water Resources, Works and Housing (2010-2012), Minister for Health (2012-2013), Speaker of parliament (2021-)
 Mohammed Ibn Chambas, President of the Economic Community of West African States (ECOWAS) (2006–2009)
 Malik Al-Hassan Yakubu, Minister for Interior (2001-2002)
 Muhammad Mumuni, Minister for Foreign Affairs (2009-2013)
 Ibrahim Mahama, Minister for Information (1968-1969)
 Mahama Iddrisu, Minister for Transport and Communications (1983-1987), Minister for Defence (1987-1993 and 1997–1999), Minister for Interior (1996-1997)
 Otiko Afisa Djaba, Minister for Gender, Children and Social Protection (2017-2018)
 John Tia, Minister for Information (2010-2012)
 Mustapha Abdul-Hamid, Minister for Information (2017-2018), Minister for Zongo and Inner City Development (2018-2021), chief executive officer of National Petroleum Authority (2021-)
 John S. Nabila, Minister for Information and Tourism (1980-1981), president of the National House of Chiefs from (2008-2016)
 Abubakar Boniface Siddique, Minister of Youth, Labour, and Employment (2005-2007), Minister of Water Resources, Public Works and Housing (2007-2009)
 Mubarak Mohammed Muntaka, Minister for Youth and Sports (January 2009-June 2009)
 C. D. Benni, Commissioner for NRC Affairs (1972-1974), formerly Ghana's ambassador to Togo and Benin, and Liberia
 Edward Mahama, formerly flag bearer of the People's National Convention (PNC), currently Ghana's Ambassador-at-Large
 Solomon Namliit Boar, North East Regional Minister (2019-)
 Gilbert Seidu Iddi, Northern Regional Minister (1997-1998 and 2000–2001), Volta Regional Minister (1998-2000)
 Joshua Alabi, Greater Accra Regional Minister (1997-1998 and 2000–2001), Northern Regional (1998-2000)
 Adam Mahama, Member of parliament for Damango-Daboya Constituency (1997-2001)
 Jacob Bawiine Boon, Member of parliament for Lambussie (1993-1997)
 Emmanuel Samba Zumakpeh, Member of parliament for Nadowli South (1993-2005)
 Zuwera Ibrahimah, Member of parliament for Salaga South (2021-)
 Alhassan Wayo Seini, Member of parliament for Tamale Central (2005-2006)
 Said Sinare, Member of parliament for Ayawaso Central (1993-1997), Ghana ambassador to Egypt (2012-2014), Ghana ambassador to Saudi Arabia (2014-2017)
 Ben Baluri Saibu, Member of parliament for West Mamprusi (1993-1997)
 Yusuf Iddrisu, Member of parliament for Yendi (1993-1997)
 Basit Abdulai Fuseini, Member of parliament for Gakpegu-Sabongida (1993-1997)
 Edward Aliedong Alhassan, Member of parliament Damango-Daboya (1993-1997)
 Muhammad Bawah Braimah, Member of parliament for Ejura-Sekyedumase (2017-)
 Issifu Pangabu Mohammed, Member of parliament for Ejura-Sekyedumase (2005-2013)
 Kojo Bonsu, Mayor of Kumasi (2013-2016)

Military and police 

 Chemogoh Kevin Dzang, Chief of the Naval Staff (1973-1974 and 1975-1977)
 Joshua Hamidu, Chief of Defence Staff (1978-1979)
 Michael Samson-Oje, Chief of Defence Staff (2016-2017)
 Bawa Andani Yakubu, Inspector General of the Ghana Police Service (1969-1971)
 Chemogoh Aadaaryeb Delle, [[Defense Attache at the Ghana Embassy, Washington DC (1982-1985) 26 years as commissioned Officer Service

Judges 

 Joseph Bawa Akamba, Justice of the Supreme Court of Ghana (2012-2016)
 William Atuguba, Justice of the Supreme Court of Ghana (1995-2018)

Others 
 Lucas Abadamloora, Catholic Bishop of the Diocese of Navrongo-Bolgatanga
 Amin Alhassan, 17th Director General of the Ghana Broadcasting Corporation (2019-)
 Albert Don-Chebe, 15th Director General of the Ghana Broadcasting Corporation (2013-2016)
 Abdul Nashiru Issahaku, Governor of the Bank of Ghana (2016-2017)
 Ibrahim Mahama, Ghanaian engineer and businessman
 Mohammed-Sani Abdulai, academic
 Philip Naameh, Bishop of the Roman Catholic Archdiocese of Tamale

NSMQ Records 

 2021: Qualified to Semi-final stage of the Ghana National Science and Maths Quiz competition for the first time, after beating Adisadel College and Kumasi Academy, with the scores; Tamale Senior High 59, Adisadel College 44 and Kumasi Academy 30.

See also 
List of senior high schools in Ghana

References 

Schools in Ghana
High schools in Ghana
Boarding schools in Ghana
Tamale, Ghana
Educational institutions established in 1951